Patrick Welch (1948–2020) was a member of the Illinois Senate.

Patrick Welch may also refer to:
 Patrick Welch (died 1802), Irish MP for Thomastown and Gowran
 Patrick Welch (died 1816), Irish MP for Callan
 Patrick W. Welch (1965–2008), English artist

See also
 George Patrick Welch (1900–1973), historian and author
 Patrick Welsh (disambiguation)
 Welch (surname)